This is a list of public art in Wrexham County Borough in north-east Wales. The county borough was formed on 1 April 1996. Most of the area was previously part of the district of Wrexham Maelor – with other communities added from Glyndŵr,  parts of the eastern half of the historic county of Denbighshire and two parts of historic Flintshire. This list applies only to works of public art on permanent display in an outdoor public space and does not, for example, include artworks in museums.

Bangor-on-Dee

Bronington

Bwlchgwyn

Chirk

Coedpoeth

Froncysyllte

Gwersyllt

Hanmer

Holt

Overton-on-Dee

Rossett

Ruabon

Tallarn Green

Wrexham

References

Wrexham County Borough
Public art